Schmidiger is a surname. Notable people with the surname include:

Cyrill Schmidiger (born 1978), Swiss footballer
Edy Schmidiger, Swiss boxer
Reto Schmidiger (born 1992), Swiss alpine skier

See also
Schmidinger